WCDX (92.1 FM) is a mainstream urban formatted broadcast radio station licensed to Mechanicsville, Virginia, serving the Richmond/Petersburg area.  WCDX is owned and operated by Urban One.  The station's studios and offices are located just north of Richmond proper on Emerywood Parkway in unincorporated Henrico County, and its transmitter is located separately a mile east of the studios.

WCDX is licensed by the FCC to broadcast in the HD Radio format.

Alumni
Juan Conde, who later became evening news anchor for local ABC affiliate WRIC-TV, was WCDX's morning man for most of the 1990s.

Translator
In addition to the main station, WCDX is relayed by an FM translator to widen its broadcast area.  The translator was launched on November 17, 2015 and is primarily directed at the Petersburg area.

References

External links
 iPower 92-1 and 104-1 Online
 

1985 establishments in Virginia
Mainstream urban radio stations in the United States
Radio stations established in 1985
CDX
CDX
Urban One stations